In economics, the consumption function describes a relationship between consumption and disposable income. The concept is believed to have been introduced into macroeconomics by John Maynard Keynes in 1936, who used it to develop the notion of a government spending multiplier.

Details
Its simplest form is the linear consumption function used frequently in simple Keynesian models:

where  is the autonomous consumption that is independent of disposable income; in other words, consumption when disposable income is zero. The term  is the induced consumption that is influenced by the economy's income level . The parameter  is known as the marginal propensity to consume, i.e. the increase in consumption due to an incremental increase in disposable income, since . Geometrically,  is the slope of the consumption function. 

Keynes proposed this model to fit three stylized facts:

 People typically spend a part, but not all of their income on consumption, and they save the rest. They typically do not borrow money to spend, or borrow money to save. This fact is modelled by requiring .
 People with higher income save a higher proportion of the income.
 People, when deciding how much to save, are insensitive to the interest rate.
By basing his model in how typical households decide how much to save and spend, Keynes was informally using a microfoundation approach to the macroeconomics of saving.

Keynes also took note of the tendency for the marginal propensity to consume to decrease as income increases, i.e. . If this assumption is to be used, it would result in a nonlinear consumption function with a diminishing slope. Further theories on the shape of the consumption function include James Duesenberry's (1949) relative consumption expenditure, Franco Modigliani and Richard Brumberg's (1954) life-cycle hypothesis, and Milton Friedman's (1957) permanent income hypothesis.

Some new theoretical works following Duesenberry's and based in behavioral economics suggest that a number of behavioural principles can be taken as microeconomic foundations for a behaviorally-based aggregate consumption function.

See also
 Aggregate demand
Absolute income hypothesis
 Life cycle hypothesis
 Measures of national income and output
 Permanent income hypothesis

Notes

Further reading
  (Undergraduate level discussion of the subject.)
  (Graduate level discussion of the subject.)

External links
 An essay examining the strengths and weaknesses of Keynes's theory of consumption

Consumption (macroeconomics)